Johann Martin Rubert, also known as Rubbert or Rupert, (c. 1614 Nuremberg– 1677) was a German composer and organist.

In 1640 Rubert became the organist at the Nikolaikirche at Stralsund. He was a composer of part-songs, violin duets, and cantatas.  Rubert was among the first composers to place non-dance movements at the head of what were considered dance suites.

References

Pratt, Waldo Selden. The History of Music. New York: G. Schirmer, Inc., 1907. 225.

German Baroque composers
German classical musicians
German classical organists
German male organists
1610s births
1677 deaths
17th-century classical composers
German male classical composers
17th-century male musicians
Male classical organists